Hemimegalencephaly (HME), or unilateral megalencephaly, is a rare congenital disorder affecting all or a part of a cerebral hemisphere. It causes severe seizures, which are often frequent and hard to control. A minority might have seizure control with medicines, but most will need removal or disconnection of the affected hemisphere as the best chance. Uncontrolled, they often cause progressive intellectual disability and brain damage and stop development.

Symptoms and signs
Seizures are the main symptom. There can be as many as hundreds of seizures a day. Seizures tend to begin soon after birth, but may sometimes commence during later infancy or, rarely, during early childhood.

Other symptoms 
 Asymmetrical or enlarged head
 Developmental delay
 Progressive weakness of half the body
 Progressive blindness of half the body

Genetics
Somatic activation of AKT3 causes hemispheric developmental brain malformations.

Pathophysiology
It is a disorder related to excessive neuronal proliferation and hamartomatous overgrowth affecting the cortical formation. The excessive proliferation is postulated to occur early and to possibly continue beyond the normal proliferative period. Epidermal growth factor is thought to play an important role in the excessive proliferation and the pathogenesis of HME.

Diagnosis
It should be suspected in infants or children with intractable, frequent seizures. On a CT scan, the affected part is distorted and enlarged. It can be diagnosed prenatally, but a lot of cases go undiagnosed until seizures begin. Ultrasound can display asymmetrical brain hemispheres.

Treatment
Although there have been a few reports of medical treatment, the main treatment is radical: remove or disconnect the affected side. However, it has a high mortality, and there have been reports of a vegetative state and seizures resuming, this time in the healthy hemisphere.

Surgery should be done as early as possible to minimize damage caused by seizures. However, a trial with drugs can be attempted for a few months before surgery, and there is a slim chance of it succeeding. The earlier surgery be done, the more the remaining side will do the missing side's job.

Benzodiazepines might control the seizures.

References

External links 

Congenital disorders of nervous system
Neurological disorders
Rare diseases
Syndromes affecting the nervous system